Exoteleia anomala, the ponderoa pine needle miner, is a moth of the family Gelechiidae. It is found in the United States, where it has been recorded from Alabama, Louisiana, Mississippi, New Mexico and Arizona.

The length of the forewings is 4–5 mm. The forewings are mottled dark gray brown to black and pale gray to white with patches of upturned scales. Adults are on wing from April to October.

The larvae feed on the needles of Pinus ponderosa.

References

Moths described in 1985
Exoteleia